Grand Prix Masters was a one-make motor racing series featuring retired Formula One drivers. The inaugural (and sole 2005) event, at the Kyalami Grand Prix Circuit in South Africa, took place on 11–13 November, but the series folded after a two-race season in 2006.

Concept
Grand Prix Masters was modeled on the lucrative seniors tours of golf and tennis. In order to compete, drivers must:

 Have retired from all forms of open wheel racing
 Have competed in (and retired from) F1 for two complete seasons
 Have passed a medical examination
 Be more than 45 years (later 40 in 2006) on 1 January for the season to follow

Car

All participants raced identical open wheel cars, which are based on the 2000 Reynard 2KI Champ Car. The chassis was built by English constructor Delta Motorsport, and was powered by a naturally aspirated, 3.5-litre, 80-degree V8 engine produced by Nicholson McLaren. The engine was based on the Cosworth XB engines previously used in IndyCar racing, and according to the series' organisers, it produced more than 650bhp at 10,400 rpm with over  torque at 7,800 rpm.

In 2007 cars were to have been powered by a Mecachrome 90-degree V8 4.0 litre. It developed  and revved to in excess of 9500 rpm.

Gearbox operation was controlled by a contemporary paddle shift arrangement.

Grand Prix Masters promoters boasted that the 650 kg (1433 lb.) cars reach . Claiming that the combination of stable aerodynamics and considerably simpler technology (than in use in modern Formula One) better demonstrate driver skill and promoted overtaking, electronic "drivers' aids" (such as traction control, power steering and ABS) were absent, and brakes were made of steel rather than carbon (as in many contemporary single seater race cars) to increase braking distances.

On track
The Grand Prix Masters car first ran in late-September 2005 in the hands of Delta Motorsport Operations Director Simon Dowson. He reported a successful shakedown, despite appearing to sit very high in the car, his helmet appearing to sit level with the top of the roll-over hoop.

In mid-October 2005, Nigel Mansell and René Arnoux tested the car at the Pembrey Circuit in South Wales. 26 October saw the first multi-car test for the series, with Mansell, Andrea de Cesaris, Stefan Johansson, Derek Warwick, Alex Caffi, Hans-Joachim Stuck, Patrick Tambay and Christian Danner running at the Silverstone Circuit in England. De Cesaris was fastest, Danner slowest whilst Tambay crashed.

Controversy
There were questions surrounding the fitness of the former Formula One stars who ended up competing in the series. Participant Christian Danner questioned the ability of 1980 World Champion Alan Jones and former GP winner Patrick Tambay in particular, given the rapid expansion of these drivers' waistlines since retiring from racing. Jones hit back claiming the only time Danner had seen a Grand Prix podium was when he passed it on the way to the lavatory. Jones' lack of fitness at the first GP Masters event might suggest Danner's assessment had some merit.

Seasons

2005

The first event, and the only event of the 2005 season, took place at Kyalami in South Africa on 13 November 2005. Nigel Mansell took pole then won after battling hard with Emerson Fittipaldi. Riccardo Patrese was third. Andrea de Cesaris finished fourth after a storming drive, where he pushed past Derek Warwick. Stefan Johansson spun out early on. Jacques Laffite retired with damaged right-front suspension after colliding with René Arnoux. As predicted, Alan Jones proved a disappointment. In practice he was up to ten seconds off the pace of Mansell, before pulling out of the race –- ostensibly due to neck injury. He was replaced by Eliseo Salazar.

2005 results
 Kyalami (South Africa), November 13

2006

In January 2006 GP Masters announced it would hold events in the following venues:

  Losail International Circuit (Qatar), April 29
  Autodromo Nazionale Monza (Italy), May 5 (cancelled)
  Silverstone Circuit (United Kingdom), August 13
  Sepang Circuit (Malaysia), October 15 (cancelled)
  Kyalami (South Africa), November 12 (cancelled)
The race scheduled for Monza was cancelled due to noise limits. The Kyalami event would later be cancelled as well. A race at Sepang was a later addition to the calendar, but was also cancelled in the end.

2006 results
 Losail International Circuit (Qatar), April 29

 Silverstone Circuit (United Kingdom), August 13

2007 (cancelled)

Three races would be held in 2007, all cancelled due to organiser bankruptcy (see below section):
  Bucharest Ring (Romania), May 20
  Kyalami (South Africa), September 23
  Losail International Circuit (Qatar), November 17

Bankruptcy
On 18 September 2007, Delta Motorsport, supplier of the GP Masters chassis, announced they were filing a petition with the British High Court to have the GP Masters Operating company placed in liquidation due to non-payment of invoices. Following a hearing on 28 November 2007, the Grand Prix Masters series was officially wound up.

In the first quarter of 2008 Delta Motorsport stated that they intend to re-launch the series under the name F1 Masters using the original car that they manufactured for the GP Masters series.

Driver statistics

References

External links
 http://www.delta-motorsport.com

2005 in motorsport
2006 in motorsport
Defunct auto racing series
Formula racing series
Formula racing
Recurring sporting events established in 2005
Recurring events disestablished in 2007
One-make series
Senior sports competitions